Kiran Malik is a Pakistani model and film actress. She made her acting debut with the movie Pinky Memsaab.

Early life and career
Born and raised in Karachi, she moved to Dubai and started her professional career as HR consultant and later started modeling. As a model she worked for various leading brands in industry. In 2018 she debuted in acting with the film Pinky Memsaab which couldn't perform well at box office but her role was appreciated. Though her first film to be shot was Zarrar which got delayed and had not been released yet. Her role in Pinky Memsaab gave her a breakthrough in industry and she also got film Money Back Guarantee. She will also be doing a song in upcoming film Dum Mastam.

Filmography

References 

1989 births
Living people
People from Karachi
21st-century Pakistani actresses
Pakistani film actresses
Pakistani female models